Judolia orthotricha is a species of beetle in the family Cerambycidae. It was described by Plavilstshikov in 1936.

References

O
Beetles described in 1936